WHCU (870 AM) is a commercial radio station in Ithaca, New York, that programs a news/talk radio format. The station has been owned by the Cayuga Radio Group subsidiary of Saga Communications since 2005.  Programming is simulcast on FM translator W249DW 97.7 MHz.

Programming and hosts
Since 2005, WHCU has been a station with conservative hosts. The station is an affiliate of CBS Radio News and carries top of the hour news coverage, as well as one-minute bottom-of-the-hour news updates during its live, local programming. It is also the flagship of Cornell University football, hockey and men's lacrosse broadcasts.

Weekday mornings kick off with "Ithaca's Morning News" with Joe Salzone, followed by  nationally syndicated programs, with Premiere Networks hosts Sean Hannity, "Coast to Coast AM with George Noory" and "This Morning, America's First News with Gordon Deal."  On weekday evenings, WHCU carries Westwood One hosts Mark Levin and John Batchelor.  Hugh Hewitt airs in late mornings. In 2021, Dennis Prager replaced Rush Limbaugh following the latter's death.

History

WHCU was first licensed as a broadcasting station, with the call sign WEAI, in May 1922 to Cornell University in Ithaca, New York. However, by this time the school already had extensive experience with radio communication on an experimental basis. The school reportedly began experimentation with a spark transmitter in 1906, and began radiotelephone work in 1910. In mid-1915 the university was issued a license to operate a "Technical and Training School" station, 8YC, and a year later was issued an Experimental station license with the call sign 8XT. (A later report states that the Experimental station's call sign was 8XU).

Beginning in April 1917, due to the start of U.S. involvement in World War I, most civilian stations had to suspend operations. However Cornell was issued a special permit by the War Department to operate a station in conjunction with a campus military unit. After the end of the war, in late 1919 the university was authorized to operate a "War Department Training and Rehabilitation School" station, WU6, which was followed early the next year by the reactivation of Experimental station 8XU.

WEAI

Effective December 1, 1921, the Department of Commerce, which regulated radio communication at this time, adopted regulations to formally establish a broadcast service category, which set aside the wavelength of 360 meters (833 kHz) for "entertainment" broadcasting, and 485 meters (619 kHz) for "market and weather reports". On May 27, 1922, Cornell University was issued a broadcasting station license with the sequentially assigned call letters WEAI, for operation on 360 meters.

The station was used as a vehicle for promoting the university's extension service and all of its programming was educational in nature.

WESG

Cornell only had the resources to broadcast for a few hours per day. In 1932, an arrangement was made with the Elmira Star-Gazette to lease unused hours to the newspaper. The station's main studio location was changed to the Mark Twain Hotel in Elmira, however Cornell continued to be the station's licensee, and the transmitter remained in Ithaca. Reflecting the newspaper's now dominant role in operating the station, WEAI's call sign was changed to WESG, and the newspaper made its debut broadcast October 2.

In late 1939 the Star-Gazette established its own station, WENY in Albany. Although the newspaper had previously made an agreement to lease WESG through 1943, as of June 3, 1940, it terminated the lease and ended its association with WESG.

WHCU

The FCC ordered Cornell to run the station itself or surrender the license. Within 12 hours of the deadline, the station signed on with borrowed staff and equipment. On July 8, 1940, WESG's call letters were changed to WHCU, which stood for "Home of Cornell University". WHCU's first complete studios and offices were completed in 1941. New studios were built in downtown Ithaca in 1957.

Cornell University sold WHCU and its sister station WYXL to Eagle Communications in 1985. Six years later, the stations moved into a new complex on Hanshaw Road in the town of Dryden, northeast of Ithaca.

WHCU and its sister stations WYXL, WQNY and WNYY were purchased by Saga Communications in 2005, under the name Cayuga Radio Group.

In March 2010, WHCU returned to the FM airwaves when its sister station WQNY launched News/Talk 870 on its HD3 channel. WHCU had been on a former WYXL translator (first at 95.5, then briefly at 95.9) before Saga turned off the translator, accommodating the introduction of WFIZ into the market. The use of WQNY-HD3 overcomes the challenges of 870's night time pattern, especially outside of Tompkins County.

In August 2010, WHCU returned to analog FM broadcasting with the reintroduction of a translator at 95.9 FM. W240CB is a 250-watt translator located on Ithaca's South Hill, and it is licensed to rebroadcast WQNY. As with Hits 103.3 and 98.7 the Vine, the company uses the translator to rebroadcast the aforementioned HD3 signal.

WHCU had a three-and-a-half-hour local news and interview based morning show each weekday called the Morning Newswatch. On April 18, 2018, this program was canceled. On July 13, 2020, Ithaca's Morning News and Ithaca's Evening News were launched.

On August 30, 2018, WHCU switched its translator from W240CB 95.9 (and WQNY-HD3, which began stunting towards a new format at this time) to W249DW 97.7.

Award
WHCU won a 1946 Special Citation of Honor Peabody Award for its program, "Radio Edition of the Weekly Press."

References

External links

FCC History Cards for WHCU (covering WEAI / WESG / WHCU from 1927-1981)

HCU
News and talk radio stations in the United States
Radio stations established in 1922
1922 establishments in New York (state)
Mass media in Ithaca, New York
Radio stations licensed before 1923 and still broadcasting